Topaz  is a 1945 documentary film, shot illegally (though with the assistance of members of the camp staff), which documented life at the Topaz War Relocation Center in Utah during World War II.

Filmed by internee Dave Tatsuno (1913–2006), it was deemed "culturally significant" by the United States Library of Congress in 1996, and was the second amateur  film ever selected for the National Film Registry (after the "Zapruder" film of the JFK assassination).

Tatsuno always credited his store supervisor, Walter Honderick, for helping him get the movie camera into the camp.  Film was smuggled out of the camp on trips that Tatsuno made to buy merchandise for the store.

While images appear to show the internees happy and enjoying their lives, Tatsuno said that they were "hamming it up" for the camera, hiding their sorrow.

See also
Japanese American internment

References

External links
Topaz essay  by Karen L. Ishizuka at National Film Registry
Topaz essay by Daniel Eagan in  America's Film Legacy: The Authoritative Guide to the Landmark Movies in the National Film Registry, A&C Black, 2010 , pages 388-390

http://www.discovernikkei.org/en/nikkeialbum/items/3575 through http://www.discovernikkei.org/en/nikkeialbum/items/3617

1945 films
United States National Film Registry films
Documentary films about the internment of Japanese Americans
American documentary films
1945 documentary films
Black-and-white documentary films
American black-and-white films
1940s English-language films
1940s American films